Rock Itoua-Ndinga (born 10 August 1983) is a Congolese professional football player.

He played in Greece with Agios Dimitrios F.C., Atromitos F.C. and Panachaiki 2005 F.C. He was shortly with University of Nigeria before moving to the Republic of Macedonia where he would play wit several teams in the Macedonian First League, namely FK Pobeda, FK Škendija, FK Rabotnički and FK Turnovo.

References

Living people
1983 births
Republic of the Congo footballers
Association football midfielders
Atromitos F.C. players
Panachaiki F.C. players
Expatriate footballers in Greece
FK Pobeda players
FK Rabotnički players
KF Shkëndija players
Expatriate footballers in North Macedonia
FK Horizont Turnovo players